"Yen" is a song by American heavy metal band Slipknot. It was released as the third single from the band's seventh studio album, The End, So Far on August 5, 2022.

Background
In an interview with Kerrang! before the album's release, vocalist Corey Taylor said, "'Yen' is probably one of my favorite songs that we've ever done. And it's such a great, cool departure for us, because there are obviously very Slipknot elements to it, but then some of the music is us kind of touching our inner Tom Waits in weird ways."

Music video
The song's music video was released on August 22, 2022. Directed by band member Shawn Crahan, it features the band performing in a large, spooky mansion with shots of unnerving, occult-like figures. The song also features an unmasked Corey Taylor as the central protagonist of the video. This is only the fourth time an unmasked Taylor has appeared in one of the band's music videos following "Before I Forget", "Dead Memories" and "Snuff." 

As of March 2023, the music video for "Yen" has over 9 million views on YouTube.

Charts

References

2022 songs
2022 singles
Slipknot (band) songs
Roadrunner Records singles